Lynne Riley (born September 8, 1958) is an American politician from the state of Georgia.

Career before politics
Riley was an accountant.

Political career
A  Republican, Riley was elected to the Fulton County in a 2004 special election to fill a vacancy caused by the death of a member. She was reelected in 2006, and served until 2010, after being elected to the Georgia House of Representatives. While on the county commission, Riley was a supporter of a controversial proposal for the secession of north Fulton County from the rest of the county, re-creating Milton County.

Riley was a member of the state House from the 50th district from 2011 to 2014. Riley's seat was a safe Republican district in north Fulton County; her only contested election for the seat was in 2010, when she won with 70% of the vote. While in the House, Riley was an ally of Republican Governor Nathan Deal and one of his chief supporters within the state legislature; she held the position of Governor's Floor Leader. She was also a member of the House's tax-writing committee.

In November 2014, Riley resigned from the state House after Deal appointed her to the position of commissioner of the Georgia Department of Revenue, effective January 11, 2015. Riley succeeded Douglas MacGinnitie as commissioner. Riley left the Department of Revenue in mid-2019 to accept an appointment from Republican Governor Brian Kemp to the post of Treasurer of Georgia.

Riley lives in Johns Creek, Georgia.

References

1958 births
Living people
Republican Party members of the Georgia House of Representatives
State treasurers of Georgia (U.S. state)
American accountants
Women accountants
21st-century American politicians
21st-century American women politicians
People from Scituate, Massachusetts
People from Fulton County, Georgia